Jin'ni-Ō (辰爾王, ? – ?) was a prince of Baekje, one of the Three Kingdoms of Korea. He was son of the 29th king, Beop of Baekje and brother of the 30th king, Mu of Baekje. He settled in Japan and became ancestor of the Ōuchi clan and Toyota clan.

He does not appear in the Samguk Sagi or Samguk Yusa but in Japanese and Chinese records. In China he is recorded in the Book of Zhou, Fengsu tong, Wan Xing Tong Pu (萬姓統譜, Genealogies of Ten Thousand Surnames), and Xing pu. In Japan he is recorded in  the Shinsen Shōjiroku.

His presence became known through a genealogy sent by Ōuchi Yoshihiro in July, 1398 to Joseon to confirm and prove his claim that he was a descendant of Prince Imseong. In the Shinsen Shōjiroku he is recorded as the 15th generation ancestor of the Ōuchi and Toyota clans.

See also 
 Beop of Baekje
 Silla–Tang alliance
 History of Korea
 Three Kingdoms of Korea
 List of monarchs of Korea

Notes 

Year of birth missing
Baekje
Korean royalty
Korean exiles
Year of death unknown